Mary Bradford may refer to:

 Mary D. Bradford (1856–1943), first woman in Wisconsin, USA to serve as Superintendent of a major city school system
 Mary C. C. Bradford (1856–?), first woman to be elected to a seat in the 1908 Democratic National Convention
 Mary Lythgoe Bradford (born 1930), American editor and poet significant to Mormon literature